Hemlata Negi is an Indian politician from Uttarakhand representing the Indian National Congress. In recent Kotdwar Municipal Corporation election, 2018, she was elected Mayor of Kotdwar with a margin of 1,568 votes in 2018. She is the first Mayor of Kotdwar.

References 

Indian National Congress politicians from Uttarakhand
Living people
Year of birth missing (living people)
Women mayors of places in Uttarakhand